Deferrisoma palaeochoriense is a thermophilic, anaerobic and mixotrophic bacterium from the genus of Deferrisoma which has been isolated from a hydrothermal vent from the Palaeochori Bay from Greece.

References

Thermodesulfobacteriota
Bacteria described in 2016